Roland Annen (September 22, 1916 – 28 August, 2005) was a Swiss field hockey player who competed in the 1936 Summer Olympics.

Annen played with the  hockey club and was a member of the Swiss team in the 1936 Olympics which was eliminated in the group stage of the tournament. He played all three matches as forward.

External links
Sports Reference Profile

References

1916 births
2005 deaths
Swiss male field hockey players
Olympic field hockey players of Switzerland
Field hockey players at the 1936 Summer Olympics